Latitude 37 is an Australian baroque trio. They play music from the 1600s and 1700s, using instruments from that era.

Latitude 37's albums Latitude 37 and Empires received nominations for the 2011 and 2014 ARIA Award for Best Classical Album.

Members
Julia Fredersdorff - Baroque violin
Laura Vaughan - Viol and lirone
Donald Nicolson - Harpsichord and organ

Discography

Albums

Awards and nominations

ARIA Music Awards
The ARIA Music Awards is an annual awards ceremony that recognises excellence, innovation, and achievement across all genres of Australian music. They commenced in 1987. 

! 
|-
| 2011
| Latitude 37
|rowspan="2" |  Best Classical Album
| 
|rowspan="2" |  
|-
| 2014
| Empires
| 
|}

References

External links
Latitude 37

Victoria (Australia) musical groups